Harinas is a Village council in Syangja District in Gandaki Province, central Nepal.

History
On 12 March 2017, the government of Nepal implemented a new local administrative structure consisting of 744 local units. With the implementation of the new local administrative structure, VDCs have been replaced with municipal & village councils. Harinas is one of these 744 local units. Harinas is created by merging Magyam Chisapani, Chitre Bhanjyang, (7-9) wards of Chinnebas, Kyakami & (6,8,9) wards of Kichnas.

Political situation
Harinas is divided into 7 Wards. It is surrounded by Tanahun District at northern side, Tanahun District from east, Chapakot & Biruwa from west and Chapakot & Tanahun District at south. Chitre Bhanjyang is its headquarter.

Population
As Harinas is created by merging Magyam Chisapani, Chitre Bhanjyang, (7-9) wards of Chinnebas, Kyakami & (6,8,9) wards of Kichnas. The sum population of Harinas, 17,343, is residing in an area of 87.48 km2.

References

See also

Populated places in Syangja District
Rural municipalities in Syangja District
Syangja District
Rural municipalities of Nepal established in 2017